Borgholzhausen is a railway station located 3 km south west of Borgholzhausen, Germany. The station is on the Osnabrück–Brackwede railway. The train services are operated by NordWestBahn.

Train services
The following services currently call at Borgholzhausen:

References 

Borgholzhausen
Railway stations in North Rhine-Westphalia
Railway stations in Germany opened in 1886